Wilfried David (22 April 1946 – 15 June 2015) was a Belgian professional road bicycle racer.

Major results

 1968
 2nd, Houthulst
 1st, Stage 7, Paris–Nice
 1st, Overall, Tour of Belgium
 2nd, Stage 1
 3rd, Stage 2

 1969
 1st, Oostduinkerke
 1st, Vichte

 1970
 1st, Mandel-Leie-Schelde

 1971
 2nd, Overall, Vuelta a España
 1st, Stage 14

 1972
 1st, Stage 7, Tour de Suisse

 1973
 1st, Brussels-Ingooigem
 1st, Stage 6a, Critérium du Dauphiné Libéré
 1st, Overall, Tour de Romandie
 2nd, Stage 1
 3rd, Stage 2
 2nd, Stage 3
 1st, Stage 4b
Tour de France:
Winner stage 15

 1976
 1st, Stage 5, Tour Méditerranéen
 2nd, Overall, Tour of Belgium
 3rd, Stage 3

References

External links 

Official Tour de France results for Wilfried David

1946 births
2015 deaths
Belgian male cyclists
Belgian Vuelta a España stage winners
Belgian Tour de France stage winners
Sportspeople from Bruges
Cyclists from West Flanders
Tour de Suisse stage winners